Rugby Ekstraliga (Polish: Ekstraliga Polska w rugby union) is the premier league for rugby union in Poland.

Polish extra league in rugby union (formerly I Liga, Series A) - the highest level of men's rugby union league games of fifteen-person teams in Poland. The competition takes place cyclically (every season, from autumn to spring) in a circular system as the national championship and is intended for the best Polish rugby clubs. They are organized by the Polish Rugby Union. The winner of the Ekstraliga final is also the Polish champion, and the weakest team is fighting for maintenance with the winner of the 1st league (formerly the 2nd league).

Champions

Clubs

See also 
 Poland national rugby union team
 Rugby union in Poland

External links 
 Official webpage of the League

Rugby union leagues in Poland
National rugby union premier leagues
Poland
1957 establishments in Poland
Sports leagues established in 1957
Professional sports leagues in Poland